Di Nü Hua is a fictional Chinese story about Princess Changping of the Ming Dynasty and her husband/lover, Zhou Shixian. The first known story was a Kunqu script written in the Qing Dynasty, while the second version was a Cantonese opera from the early 1900s later found in Japan and Shanghai. Little information is available from this early 1900s version. The contemporary prevailing version, not meant to be historically accurate, comes from the second Cantonese opera script.

The story unfolds as Princess Changping and Zhou Shixian are introduced to each other, participating in an arranged marriage.

They meet and get engaged with the blessing of their parents. Her father, the emperor, is overthrown by Li Zicheng. To save herself, the Princess hides as a nun in a monastery, but she happens to meet Zhou again. After being found by the new regime (the Qing dynasty), she follows Zhou's plan to eventually commit suicide. Zhou formulates a plan to make sure that her father is properly buried (without asking for a proper burial ceremony) while her little brother is released to safety. Zhou returns alone to negotiate with the new regime using the bargaining power vested in him by a written request from her. Once the new regime makes good on these promises, the couple return to her former home for a wedding ceremony. They take poison on their wedding night in the palace garden where they first meet.

Adaptations
Based on the Kunqu version and other publications, Playwright Tang Ti-sheng adaptation of this into a Cantonese opera script debuted in the Lee Theatre on 7 June 1957. Actresses Yam Kim Fai and Bak Sheut Sin were members of the original cast in leading roles. These two actresses played the leads until 1961 and then only sporadically from 1962 to 1970.

In October 2007, Yuen Siu Fai, as the Princess's father in  2006/7 performances in Hong Kong and Macau (40 total) schooled one academic on a radio broadcast. The talk show is available online (in Cantonese).  Translation: This title has become this popular today mostly by word of mouth since the mid-1960s; staged at Kai De Amusement Park Cantonese Opera Theatre. The performances of Chor Fung Ming throughout the 1970s and 1980s in newly developed satellite cities and towns were very well received.  The role of male lead is extremely heavy by design and demonstrates the ‘masculine’ traits of Yam style (e.g. Chinese: 走鑼邊花). The more organic actors/actresses in this role would find it more emotionally demanding. It was non-stop and exhausting after intermission.

While most well-known Tang works cater to the female leads, this is an exception. The importance of Zhou Shixian, instead of the Princess, in this 1957 version is also unique compared to other versions such as Eternal Regret of Dynasty Ming (Chinese: 《明末遺恨》) and How Jing-ngo Slew the Tiger (Chinese: 《貞娥刺虎》), both of Peking opera.

Notable performances

Loong Kim Sang 2019
From 28 November 2019 to 14 December 2019, the Loong Kim Sang performance commemorated 30 years since the passing of her mentor Yam Kim Fai.

Peking opera 2018
According to Yu Kuizhi, this production was inspired by the (late 2006 to early 2007) performances at the Lyric Theatre, Hong Kong.

Yu talked specifically how much the 2006 performance of Loong Kim Sang impressed him and addressed Loong as sensei (meaning accomplished, to show respect to someone who has achieved a certain level of mastery in an art form or some other skill) throughout that event.

Films/CD/DVD
A film starring some of the Cantonese opera original cast was released in 1959, while the album of full 4-hour stage version was released in 1960. In 1976, the film titled Prince Chang Ping was directed by John Woo, starring the Chor Fung Ming (Young Phoenix) Cantonese Opera Troupe along Leung Sing Bor and Lang Chi Bak. A live recording of the stage performance by Chor Fung Ming (Young Phoenix) Cantonese Opera Troupe in December 2007 to celebrate the 50th anniversary of debut is available in DVD/CD.

TV
TV stations, in Hong Kong as well as Taiwan, have a few productions, sometimes renamed, relating to the 1957 version. In 1981, ATV Home adapted the play into a television drama titled Princess Cheung Ping (Chinese: 武侠帝女花), in a wuxia setting, starring Damian Lau, Michelle Yim and David Chiang. In 2003, TVB produced Perish in the Name of Love, a television series loosely based on the original play.  Steven Ma and Charmaine Sheh starred in the leading roles.

Summary
 1959 Film - , Story by Disheng Tang.
 1976 Film - , directed by John Woo, Story by Disheng Tang.
 1981 ATV Home production - Renamed :()
 1994 Taiwan production - Renamed in PRC as :( translated as Luan Shi Bu Le Qing) by Director: Lai Kin-kwok (Chinese: 賴建國), starring Cecilia Yip and Angie Chiu as the male lead and female lead respectively.
 2003 TVB production Perish In the Name of Love
 2008 50th Anniversary DVD (Live Recording of Stage Production)

References

External links
1959 film
 
 
1976 film
 
 

Chinese operas
Cantonese opera